Harry Zech (born 25 February 1969) is a former Liechtenstein football defender.

Making his debut against Switzerland in 1991, Zech would go on to win 40 caps and score one goal for his country. Zech was also the captain for much of his later years in the national squad. He last played at the club level for USV Eschen/Mauren.

Zech is also a winemaker, and is the proprietor of the Harry Zech Winebau Cantina in Schaanwald.

Honours
Individual
Liechtensteiner Footballer of the Year: 1995-1996

International goals

References

Liechtenstein international footballers
FC Vaduz players
USV Eschen/Mauren players
Liechtenstein footballers
1969 births
Living people
FC Balzers players
Association football defenders